This list of sequenced plant genomes contains plant species known to have publicly available complete genome sequences that have been assembled, annotated and published. Unassembled genomes are not included, nor are organelle only sequences. For all kingdoms, see the list of sequenced genomes.

See also List of sequenced algae genomes.

Bryophytes

Vascular plants

Lycophytes

Ferns

Gymnosperms

Angiosperms

Amborellales

Magnoliids

Chlorantales 
Magnoliales

Eudicots

Proteales

Ranunculales

Trochodendrales

Caryophyllales

Rosids

Asterids

Monocots

Grasses

Other non-grasses

Press releases announcing sequencing 
Not meeting criteria of the first paragraph of this article in being nearly full sequences with high quality, published, assembled and publicly available. This list includes species where sequences are announced in press releases or websites, but not in a data-rich publication in a refereed peer-review journal with DOI.
Corchorus olitorius (Jute mallow), fibre plant 2017
Corchorus capsularis 2017
 Fraxinus excelsior, European ash (2013 draft)

See also 
 List of sequenced eukaryotic genomes
 List of sequenced animal genomes
 List of sequenced archaeal genomes
 List of sequenced bacterial genomes
 List of sequenced fungi genomes
 List of sequenced plastomes
 List of sequenced protist genomes

External links
 http://plabipd.de/timeline_view.ep
 http://genomevolution.org/wiki/index.php/Sequenced_plant_genomes
 https://phytozome.jgi.doe.gov/pz/portal.html
 https://bioinformatics.psb.ugent.be/plaza/

References 

Biology-related lists
Plant